Gagik Garushi Harutyunyan (born 23 March 1948) is an Armenian politician and jurist who served as the president of the Constitutional Court of Armenia from 1996 to 2018. He served as Prime Minister of Armenia from 22 November 1991 to 30 July 1992. 

Harutyunyan was elected as Vice President of Levon Ter-Petrossian and served from 11 November 1991 until February 1996, when the post was abolished by the new constitution. As replacement, the National Assembly elected him as the president of the center of constitutional law of Armenia.

References

External links
 The President of the Constitutional Court

1948 births
Living people
Prime Ministers of Armenia
Armenian legal writers
Armenian scholars of constitutional law